In mathematics, especially in category theory, the codensity monad is a fundamental construction associating a monad to a wide class of functors.

Definition

The codensity monad of a functor  is defined to be the right Kan extension of  along itself, provided that this Kan extension exists. Thus, by definition it is in particular a functor

The monad structure on  stems from the universal property of the right Kan extension.

The codensity monad exists whenever  is a small category (has only a set, as opposed to a proper class, of morphisms) and  possesses all (small, i.e., set-indexed) limits. It also exists whenever  has a left adjoint.

By the general formula computing right Kan extensions in terms of ends, the codensity monad is given by the following formula:

Examples

Codensity monads of right adjoints

If the functor  admits a left adjoint  the codensity monad is given by the composite  together with the standard unit and multiplication maps.

Concrete examples for functors not admitting a left adjoint

In several interesting cases, the functor  is an inclusion of a full subcategory not admitting a left adjoint. For example, the codensity monad of the inclusion of FinSet into Set is the ultrafilter monad associating to any set  the set of ultrafilters on  This was proven by Kennison and Gildenhuys, though without using the term "codensity". In this formulation, the statement is reviewed by Leinster.

A related example is discussed by Leinster: the codensity monad of the inclusion of finite-dimensional vector spaces (over a fixed field ) into all vector spaces is the double dualization monad given by sending a vector space  to its double dual

Thus, in this example, the end formula mentioned above simplifies to considering (in the notation above) only one object  namely a one-dimensional vector space, as opposed to considering all objects in  Adámek show that, in a number of situations, the codensity monad of the inclusion

of finitely presented objects (also known as compact objects) is a double dualization monad with respect to a sufficiently nice cogenerating object. This recovers both the inclusion of finite sets in sets (where a cogenerator is the set of two elements), and also the inclusion of finite-dimensional vector spaces in vector spaces (where the cogenerator is the ground field).

Sipoş showed that the algebras over the codensity monad of the inclusion of finite sets (regarded as discrete topological spaces) into topological spaces are equivalent to Stone spaces.
Avery shows that the Giry monad arises as the codensity monad of natural forgetful functors between certain categories of convex vector spaces to measurable spaces.

Relation to Isbell duality

Di Liberti shows that the codensity monad is closely related to Isbell duality: for a given small category  Isbell duality refers to the adjunction

induced by this adjunction is shown to be the codensity monad of the Yoneda embedding 

Conversely, the codensity monad of a full small dense subcategory  in a cocomplete category  is shown to be induced by Isbell duality.

See also

References

 
  

Footnotes

Category theory